Elena Partac (born 25 March, 1984) is a Moldovan chess player. She is a Woman Grandmaster (WGM) since 2003, her highest rating was 2275 (in July, 2004).

In 2000, she won the bronze medal at the European junior team championship. She was a member of the national team of Moldova in 2002, 2004, 2006, 2008 and 2010, during the Chess Olympiads.

She won the Moldovan women's championship in 2002, 2003, 2006 and 2010.

References

Moldovan female chess players
1984 births
Living people
Chess woman grandmasters